Bozveh is a village in Baranduz Rural District, in the Central District of Urmia County, West Azerbaijan Province, Iran. At the 2006 census, its population was 353, in 103 families.

References 

Populated places in Urmia County